The Shrine of Our Lady of Mount Carmel is a Roman Catholic church located in Los Realejos, in the north of the island of Tenerife (Canary Islands, Spain). It is located in the district of San Agustín.

It is considered the most important Marian shrine in the north of the island of Tenerife. The Our Lady of Mount Carmel is the patron of the La Orotava Valley.

History 
In the place where the present church the Convent of San Andrés and Santa Mónica (which belonged to the Augustinians) was. The February 21, 1952 a fire destroyed the convent. The July 24, 1955 was held the ceremony of blessing of the first stone of the new Shrine, the building was designed by Tomás Machado in 1953 and remained open for worship July 25, 1965.

The July 18, 1982, the image of the Virgin of Mount Carmel was one of the first images of the island Canonical Coronation.

Since 1999, the Shrine and its surroundings are considered of cultural interest of the Canary Islands (BIC).

The July 25, 2015, under the 50th anniversary of the consecration, the temple was declared a Shrine with the title of Bishop of the Diocese of Tenerife, Bernardo Álvarez Afonso.

References

See also 

 Roman Catholic Diocese of San Cristóbal de La Laguna
 Los Realejos
 Our Lady of Mount Carmel

Catholic Church in the Canary Islands
Roman Catholic churches completed in 1965
Churches in Tenerife
Shrines to the Virgin Mary
Roman Catholic shrines in Spain
Our Lady of Mount Carmel
 Bien de Interés Cultural landmarks in the Province of Santa Cruz de Tenerife
20th-century Roman Catholic church buildings in Spain